Ramlem may refer to:
 Ramlem-ye Olya
 Ramlem-ye Sofla